Herman Law is a hill in the Ettrick Hills range, part of the Southern Uplands of Scotland. It is the terminal northeast Donald of a ridge that runs parallel to the A708 road on its southern side, also being the last to share the Dumfries and Galloway and Scottish Borders border. It is the least prominent Donald, just qualifying for the necessary 30m of prominence. Usually climbed with the neighbouring hills of the ridge, the most common start point is Birkhill Farm to the west.

References

Mountains and hills of the Southern Uplands
Mountains and hills of Dumfries and Galloway
Mountains and hills of the Scottish Borders
Donald mountains